Kyle Switzer (born October 10, 1985) is a Canadian actor. He played Rick Geddes in the TV show 15/Love.  He also had a supporting role in the first two episodes of the television comedy/drama Reaper and a recurring role in the new hit show "Being Human" for SYFY.

Switzer appeared in the 2010 film The High Cost of Living, opposite Zach Braff. He is Jewish.

Filmography

Actor

References

External links

1985 births
Living people
Canadian male television actors
Jewish Canadian male actors
Male actors from Ottawa
Canadian male film actors
21st-century Canadian male actors